Serixia rubripennis is a species of beetle in the family Cerambycidae. It was described by Maurice Pic in 1931.

References

Serixia
Beetles described in 1931